Gustavo Rodríguez (May 27, 1958 – April 11, 2020) was a Mexican publicist, comedian, actor, screenwriter, producer, TV director, gamer, and video game journalist.

In Mexico, he is widely recognized as the pioneer of the gaming scene there and in the rest of Latin America as a promoter of video game journalism.

As a comedian he was best known for his works with Mexican comedian Eugenio Derbez.

Life

Youth 
According to Rodríguez himself, his taste for videogames started in 1976 with the NESA PONG, a home version of Pong.

He later bought an Intellivision and got fond of Burgertime and Night Stalker, and started to exchange games with a friend and future business partner, José Sierra.

In 1988 Rodríguez bought a Nintendo Entertainment System with Super Mario Bros., Duck Hunt and Legend of Zelda, the latter being his main and first approach to the games of this company.

Before studying publicity, Rodríguez consumed marijuana for the first and last time but he decided not to do it again because he preferred to be certain that the ideas he later had for advertising were due to his own creativity and not the substance.

Publicity 
Rodríguez begin to study publicity in 1977. After graduation, he founded the agency Network Publicidad with his friend and also publicist, José "Pepe" Sierra.

Network Publicidad had, among its clients, the Mexican divisions of Berol and Casio, and the Mexican government agency "Pronósticos para la Asistencia Pública" (literally: "Forecasts for Public Assistance") for which Rodríguez and Sierra developed the concept of "Melate", a Mexican state-owned lottery.

One of the agency's clients was a Mexican entrepreneur named Jorge Nogami. Nogami decided to try his luck importing videogames to Mexico, and in the late 1980s, he opened the first Nintendo Official store in Mexico City.

Since the target audience was very specific for the time, Rodríguez and Sierra chose to launch a brochure dedicated to Nintendo products and videogames in general, distributed for free and issued weekly (which was later changed to every fortnight).

Club Nintendo and Nintendomania 
Launched in December 1991 by Rodríguez and José Sierra, the project of the brochure evolved to the monthly magazine of Club Nintendo, which became one of the first and most important video game magazines in Latin America.

The magazine produced more than 200 issues, publishing until February 2019.

The concept became a television show, Nintendomanía, which aired in 1995 and lasted until 2000, when (despite its popularity) was canceled due to rising production costs associated with the rising popularity of the internet.

From 2014 to 2015 Rodríguez hosted a show with a similar concept in Power Up Gamers, broadcast on FOROtv.

In 2015 he hosted Zero Control which was broadcast on TeleHit and later (2016) on Televisa Deportes Network as E-Sports de Zero Control with focus on Esports.

In 2019 Rodríguez joined Televisa Networks to host Retro game and Game-Volution, both broadcast on BitMe.

Screenwriter and comedian 
After Rodríguez (with José Sierra) wrote a script for a live event that was well received, he was invited to collaborate with comedian Anabel Ferreira and through her, came into contact with the comedian Eugenio Derbez.

In 1991 Derbez had a participation in "La Movida" (literally: "The Move"), a television series hosted by actress and host Veronica Castro. Rodríguez and Sierra wrote Derbez's material, and this marked the beginning of the laboral relationship between the three: Derbez as comedian with Gus Rodríguez and José Sierra as head writers.

As a screenwriter, Rodríguez was best known for his scripts and roles in shows starring or produced by Eugenio Derbez, as "Al Derecho y Al Derbez" (1992–1995), "Derbez en cuando" (1998–1999), "XHDRbZ" (2002–2004) and "La familia P. Luche" (2007–2012).

In XHDRBZ Rodríguez played the role of the character "Simón Paz" for the segment «Las 5 herencias». (Literal translation: "The 5 inheritances". The Spanish pronunciation, "Las cinco herencias", sounds similar to "Las Incoherencias" or "The Incoherences".)

According to Eugenio Derbez, Rodríguez co-created his emblematic character of "Armando Hoyos" during Derbez's participation in "La Movida"), along with other characters.

From 2005 to 2010, Rodríguez was in charge of the direction of "Vecinos" (2005–present), a sitcom produced by Derbez.

In news media, Rodríguez collaborated with the humor section of the newscast «Primero Noticias» (2004–2016), along with Mexican journalist Carlos Loret de Mola.

Dubbing and adaptation 
He was involved in script adaptation and dubbing for Latin American audiences. He dubbed roles in Wreck It Ralph, Shrek 2, Ghostbusters, Pixels, Night at the Museum 2, among others. He lent his voice to George Westhouse in the video game Assassin's Creed: Syndicate.

In the 2010s he collaborated in the adaptation of the Spanish television comedy "Aquí no hay quien viva" to the Mexican sitcom "Vecinos" (Literal translation: "Neighbors").

Other works 
Rodríguez also dedicated himself to giving conferences. One was on the subject of creativity and entitled: "Cómo nossurgen las ideas". In Spanish the title can be read either as "How ideas urge us" ("Nos urgen") or "How ideas arise in us". ("Nos surgen")

Death 
Rodríguez was diagnosed with mesothelioma in early October 2019. He lost a lung and his physical condition diminished gradually.

Despite some improvement, Rodríguez died in the company of his family at the age of 61 after an allergic reaction to treatment worsened his condition on April 10, 2020.

Gus Rodríguez left messages and instructions in his cell phone for his son (Javier Rodríguez Ávila) and family to follow in case of his death.

This included inheriting some of the video games from his personal collection to close friends, scattering his ashes in the Firefly sanctuary in the Mexican state of Tlaxcala and an audio recording with a last will dedicated to his fans in which Rodríguez states:

According to Javier Rodríguez Ávila, his father had the custom of sometimes drawing portraits of friends who died a few days after hearing about their death.

Among the notes and files that Gus Rodríguez left in his cell phone, Javier found a self portrait that Gus Rodríguez apparently drew shortly after he was 
diagnosed with mesothelioma. Those portraits were later published on Gus Rodríguez's personal Instagram account.

Javier Rodríguez Ávila made his intentions to keep Gus Rodríguez's social media accounts active public and work on a tribute to his father. He also announced that the family took the decision to auction some of Rodríguez's significant personal belongings and donate the proceeds to a foundation dedicated to fighting mesothelioma.

Personal life 
Rodríguez included Chevy Chase and Leslie Nielsen among his influences in comedy, the latter for his surreal humour in the movies Airplane! and The Naked Gun.

Besides video games, Rodríguez also enjoyed theater, drawing, and television series; referring to The Big Bang Theory as one of his favorites because of how the writers had developed several versions of the same archetypal character (in this case, the nerd) when just one could have been enough to make a sitcom; and how script remained loyal to characters, avoiding the use of jokes that might have had a place but did not fit the character.

During his life, Rodríguez had the opportunity to visit Japan about 7 times, some of these related to his work as a gaming journalist.

See also 
 Eugenio Derbez

References

External links 
 Gus Rodríguez on Twitter.

1960 births
2020 deaths
Mexican male comedians
Mexican male video game actors
Mexican male television actors
Mexican television producers
Mexican television directors
Mexican male voice actors
Mexican video game journalists